Hardyville may refer to:
 Hardyville, Arizona, a ghost town in Mohave County, currently within the city limits of Bullhead City
 Hardyville, California, former name of Hardy, California
 Hardyville, Kentucky
 Hardyville, Virginia